The House of Orsini del Balzo was an Italian noble family from the 13th and 14th centuries.

The dynasty was founded with the marriage between Roberto from the Orsini family and Sveve del Balzo from the House of Baux. The family produced a Queen of Naples and held the principal title of Count of Soleto before it was confiscated by Pope Boniface IX.

Family tree

References

Orsini family
Italian noble families
House of Baux